Phillip Youmans (born February 18, 2000) is an American filmmaker. He is the first African-American director to win the Founders Prize at Tribeca Film Festival, which he received for his 2019 directorial debut, Burning Cane.

Early life and education
Youmans was born and raised in New Orleans. He first became interested in film-making when he was 13. Youmans attended two high schools through a dual enrollment program: Benjamin Franklin High School and New Orleans Center for Creative Arts.

He completed his freshman year at New York University in May 2019. In October 2019 he stated he may drop out of the program to focus on his career.

Career 
Youmans wrote, shot, directed and edited his first feature-length film, Burning Cane, as a senior in high school, when he was 17. The film grew from a short film that Youmans wrote called The Glory. It tells the story of a woman (played by Karen Kaia Livers) in rural Louisiana and her relationships with her alcoholic son and a local preacher. It also stars and was co-produced by Wendell Pierce. Raised Baptist, Youmans stated that the goal of Burning Cane was to "touch on [] how rigid religious conviction can be within the rural South, especially under sort of rigid interpretation of Protestantism." Youmans financed the film with $2500 in personal savings, an Indiegogo campaign, and donations from friends and family.

Burning Cane won the Founders Prize and the prize for best cinematography in a U.S. narrative feature film at the 2019 Tribeca Film Festival. Youmans is the first African-American director to receive the Founders Prize; he is also the youngest director to have a film accepted to the Tribeca Film Festival.

Youmans announced that he is currently developing his next feature film, which will focus on "the Black Panther chapter in New Orleans during 1978."

Awards and nominations

References

External links 
Official website

2000 births
Living people
African-American film directors
21st-century American male actors
People from New Orleans
African-American screenwriters
Male actors from Louisiana
21st-century African-American people
20th-century African-American people